Dil Here Naam is a Pakistani romantic drama series, produced by Urdu 1. The drama airs weekly on Urdu1. It stars Adnan Siddiqui, Anum Fayyaz and Noor Hassan Rizvi in lead roles.

Cast
Adnan Siddiqui
Anum Fayyaz
Noor Hassan Rizvi
Shakeel
Shamim Hilaly
Birjees Farooqui as Sania

References

Urdu 1 original programming